Kévin Monzialo Bokolo (born 28 July 2000) is a French professional footballer who plays as a forward for Austrian club St. Pölten on loan from the  Swiss club Lugano. Born in France, he plays for the Congo national team.

Club career

Juventus
Monzialo joined Juventus from Stade Malherbe Caen in August 2018. On 18 April 2019 he made his professional debut in Serie C for Juventus U23 in a game against Gozzano, substituting Nicolò Pozzebon in the 85th minute.

Loan to Grasshoppers
On 16 August 2019, he joined Swiss club Grasshopper Club Zürich on a season-long loan with an option to buy.

Lugano
On 12 October 2020, he was loaned to Swiss club Lugano. The transfer was made permanent on 22 January 2021.

Loan to St. Pölten
On 19 January 2022, Monzialo joined St. Pölten in Austria on loan.

International career
Born in France, Monzialo is of Congolese descent. He is a youth international for France.  He was called up to the Congo national team for a set of friendlies in September 2022. He debuted with the Congo in a friendly 3–3 tie with Madagascar on 24 September 2022.

References

External links
 

2000 births
Sportspeople from Pontoise
Living people
Republic of the Congo footballers
Republic of the Congo international footballers
French footballers
France youth international footballers
French sportspeople of Republic of the Congo descent
Republic of the Congo expatriate footballers
French expatriate footballers
Association football forwards
Cergy Pontoise FC players
Stade Malherbe Caen players
Juventus F.C. players
Juventus Next Gen players
Grasshopper Club Zürich players
FC Lugano players
SKN St. Pölten players
Championnat National 3 players
Serie C players
Swiss Challenge League players
Swiss Super League players
2. Liga (Austria) players
French expatriate sportspeople in Italy
French expatriate sportspeople in Switzerland
French expatriate sportspeople in Austria
Expatriate footballers in Italy
Expatriate footballers in Switzerland
Expatriate footballers in Austria
Footballers from Val-d'Oise
Black French sportspeople